The Trial of Donald Westhof (German: Der Kampf des Donald Westhof) is a 1927 German silent crime film directed by Fritz Wendhausen and starring Oskar Homolka, Karin Evans and Imre Ráday. It was shot at the Babelsberg Studios in Berlin. The film's sets were designed by the art director Robert Neppach. It premiered at the Ufa-Palast am Zoo in Berlin. Produced by UFA, it was distributed as part of the Parufamet agreement.

Cast
 Oskar Homolka as Justizrat Lessing
 Karin Evans as  Olga Wolgast
 Imre Ráday as  Donald Westhof 
 Paul Henckels   as Professor Westhof, Donalds Vater
 Hermann Vallentin   as Spieß, ein Gastwirt
 Paul Otto   as Gerichtsvorsitzender
 Erna Morena    as Thea Lessing, seine Frau
 Lina Lossen   as Leni Westhof
 Nikolai Malikoff   as Kußmaul, ein Schieber
 Emilie Kurz   as Frau Spieß
 Elizza La Porta   as Bertha Spieß, beider Tochter
 Max Gülstorff   as Defense lawyer
 Erich Kaiser-Titz   as Prosecutor
 Valeska Stock as Frau Busse
 Emil Heyse as  Oberlehrer

References

Bibliography
 Nichols, Nina Da Vinci.  Pirandello and Film. University of Nebraska Press, 1995.

External links

1927 films
Films of the Weimar Republic
1927 crime films
German silent feature films
German crime films
Films directed by Fritz Wendhausen
Films based on German novels
Films with screenplays by Fritz Wendhausen
German black-and-white films
UFA GmbH films
Films shot at Babelsberg Studios
1920s German films